The 2011 Ivy League Baseball Championship Series took place at Bill Clarke Field in Princeton, New Jersey, on May 7 and 8, 2011.  The series matched the regular season champions of each of the league's two divisions.  , the winner of the series, claimed the Ivy League's automatic berth in the 2011 NCAA Division I baseball tournament.  It was Princeton's seventh title, extending their lead for most championships.  It was also their first championship series win since 2006, when they won their fifth in the previous seven years.

Dartmouth has appeared in the Ivy League Championship Series every year since 2008, winning in 2009 and 2010.

Results

References

Ivy League Baseball Championship Series
Tournament